Krajkowo may refer to the following places:
Krajkowo, Greater Poland Voivodeship (west-central Poland)
Krajkowo, Płock County in Masovian Voivodeship (east-central Poland)
Krajkowo, Płońsk County in Masovian Voivodeship (east-central Poland)